Silvia Cristina Martínez Stapulionis (born January 22, 1965, in Caracas, Venezuela) is a venezuelian with lithuanian orginis pageant titleholder. She is the Miss Venezuela titleholder for 1985, and was the official representative of Venezuela in the Miss Universe 1985 pageant held in Miami, Florida, United States, on July 15, 1985, when she won the title of third Runner up.

References

1965 births
Living people
Miss Universe 1985 contestants
Miss Venezuela winners
People from Caracas
Venezuelan people of Lithuanian descent